The Slovakia national under-16 football team, controlled by the Slovak Football Association, is Slovakia's national under 16 football team and is considered to be a feeder team for the Slovakia U17 team.

Recent results

Current squad 
The following players were called up for the Friendly match against .

Staff

See also
Slovakia national football team
Slovakia national under-21 football team
Slovakia national under-19 football team
Slovakia national under-18 football team
Slovakia national under-17 football team
Slovakia national under-15 football team

External links
 Slovak Football Association 
  

European national under-16 association football teams
under-16